The 1921 Coupe de France Final was a football match held at Stade Pershing, Paris on April 24, 1921, that saw Red Star defeat Olympique de Paris 2–1 thanks to goals by Robert Clavel and Marcel Naudin.

Match details

See also
Coupe de France 1920-1921

External links
Coupe de France results at Rec.Sport.Soccer Statistics Foundation
Report on French federation site

Coupe De France Final
1921
Coupe De France Final 1921
April 1921 sports events
1921 in Paris